("service in the French style") is the practice of serving various dishes of meal at the same time, with the diners helping themselves from the serving dishes.

Formal dinners were served à la française from the Middle Ages to the 19th century, but in modern times it has been largely supplanted by service à la russe in restaurants. Service à la française still exists today in the form of the buffet, and remains popular for small and large gatherings in homes, companies, hotels, and other group settings.  It is also similar to the Chinese style of serving large groups in many Chinese restaurants.

History
The formalized  was a creation of the Baroque period, helped by the growth of published cookbooks setting out grand dining as it was practiced at the French court, led by François Pierre de la Varenne's Le Cuisinier françois (1651) and Le Pâtissier françois (1653).  As in other matters of taste and fashion, France took over from Italy as the leader of Europe, and by the 18th century the French style was diffused across the rest of Europe, and those who could afford them hired French chefs. 

Over the course of the 19th century,  was replaced by service à la russe in grand dining. This had the advantage of making the food much hotter when it reached the diner, and reducing the huge number of dishes and condiments previously found on the table at the same time. It also ensured that everybody could taste everything they wanted, which in practice the old system often did not allow.  On the other hand, the effect of magnificent profusion was reduced, and many more footmen and more tableware were required, making it an option only the rich could afford. It also reduced the time spent at the table, and the amount of food needed.

Organization of the meal
 
The meal was divided into two, three or four courses, "removes" or "services": soup and fish; meat entrées; and desserts, all with various side dishes. A supper, long after the main dinner, might just have one course, plus dessert. Each course included a variety of dishes, all set at the same time at the table. Guests served themselves and their neighbours; the men were generally supposed to help the ladies next to them. The table was set and the first remove placed on the table before the guests entered the dining room.  The serving dishes might be removed after the first course of soup or fish, or not. They were always cleared after the entrées, before serving dessert, except for a period in the mid-18th century, when at grand meals the desserts were placed in the centre of the table from the start of the meal. 

There was supposed, by the cookery books, to be a more or less fixed ratio of around four dishes per diner, all different.  Unlike today, when doubling the number of diners from say 12 to 24 will normally mean doubling the quantity prepared of each type of food, service à la française doubled the number of different dishes of all types, to about 96.  Therefore, in a large dinner, there was no chance for every diner to taste everything on the table, and two diners at different points around the table might well both have a hearty dinner, without tasting any of the same food, as with a large modern buffet.  But whereas in the Middle Ages and Renaissance the best food was placed on the table with the most important diners, or the centre of a very large table, the lesser tables or edges of the main table doing rather less well, now the quality of food was even across the table.  But now only diners accepted as more of less of the same status eat in the same room at all.

In practice, guests might not be aware of what all the many dishes on the table were, or be able to see or obtain them.  The long account in a letter from a young American lady of a dinner for 18 people on New Year's Day 1852 at an aristocratic English country house, includes "I cannot tell you how many kinds of soup there were. Suffice it, that mine was most delicious". 

In the Renaissance the dessert course might be served in a different room, or at the other end of a large room, sometimes in buffet style. 

Service à la française sometimes required so much food to be set out that it was the custom of some hosts to have a second dinner party the following day, using what was left over for a slightly smaller number of less-important guests.  William Makepeace Thackeray's character Major Pendennis (1850) is "indignant at being invited to a 'second-day dinner'".

Until about 1800, no glasses or drinks were on the table at the start of the meal. Footmen were beckoned and brought a salver with a glass of wine, and a decanter of water to dilute it if desired.

Modifications

A modified form of service à la française in which several large dishes are brought out for each diner to help themself from is known as "family-style" in less formal restaurants, as they replicate the typical way in which small family meals are served. The buffet style is essentially a variation of the French service in which all of the food is available, at the correct temperature, in a serving space other than the dining table, and guests commute there to be served or sometimes to serve themselves, and then carry their plate back to the table.  

Buffets vary from the very informal (a gathering of friends in a home, or the serving of brunch at a hotel) to the rather formal setting of a wedding reception, for example.  The "buffet" format is preferred on occasions where a very large number of guests is to be accommodated efficiently by a small number of service personnel.

See also

Degustation
Silver service
Small plates
Tasting menu

References

Works cited 
Flanders, Judith, The Victorian House: Domestic Life from Childbirth to Deathbed, 2003, Harper Perennial,  
Strong, Roy, Feast: A History of Grand Eating, 2002, Jonathan Cape,

Further reading 
 All Manners of Food: Eating and Taste in England and France from the Middle Ages to the Present by Stephen Mennell. University of Illinois, 1995.
 The Rituals of Dinner: The Origins, Evolution, Eccentricities, and Meaning of Table Manners by Margaret Visser. New York: Penguin Books, 1992.
 Food in History by Reay Tannahill. New York: Crown, 1995.
 Patrick Rambourg, Histoire de la cuisine et de la gastronomie françaises, Paris, Ed. Perrin (coll. tempus n° 359), 2010, 381 pages. 
 "A la Française: the Waning of a Long Dining Tradition" by Peter Brears, in Luncheon, Luncheon and Other Meals - Eating with the Victorians, Ed. C. Anne Wilson, 1992. Alan Sutton Publishing, Dover.

Serving and dining